Alfred Alexander Leitch was born on 5 February 1894
 in Killarney, Manitoba, Canada. He grew into a tall young man. He enlisted in the Canadian Expeditionary Force on 15 May 1917 as an unmarried student. Upon his enlistment, he designated his next of kin as Mary J. Leitch of Winnipeg, Manitoba, Canada. He was accepted for military service despite having a deformed foot.

He was married to Evelyn Rachel Leitch. He died on 31 December 1954; she survived him by almost 45 years, until 22 December 1999. They are buried in Plot 274C, Range J, Highwood Cemetery, High River, Alberta, Canada.

World War I
See also Aerial victory standards of World War I

After training as a pilot, he was appointed as a Flying Officer in the Royal Flying Corps in the rank of second lieutenant on  2 October 1917. He was then posted to No. 43 Squadron RFC from 28 December 1917 to 3 January 1918. He then transferred to No. 65 Squadron RFC to serve as a Sopwith Camel pilot. He scored his first aerial victory shortly after his transfer, driving down an Albatros D.V over Dadizeele on 5 February 1918.

He did not score again until 19:50 hours on 9 May, when he drove down a Pfalz D.III over Wiencourt-l'Équipée, France. Six days later, on an evening patrol, he destroyed a  Fokker Triplane southeast of Albert, France. On 20 May 1918, he was promoted to the rank of captain while employed as a flight commander. Five days later, he drove down and captured an Albatros D.V at Senlis, France. He finished off May by becoming an ace, destroying another Albatros D.V southwest of Albert, France on 29 May.

On 26 June 1918, he destroyed a Pfalz D.III and drove another down out of control, scoring his double win east of Albert at 20:30 hours. On 4 September 1918 he transferred out of 65 Squadron.

He was awarded the Military Cross for valour. His Military Cross citation was gazetted on 16 September, and read, in part:

"...During recent operations he displayed great courage and determination in attacking superior forces of enemy aircraft, and in engaging with machine-gun fire enemy troops and transport on the ground...."

Shortly thereafter, on 2 November 1918, his award of the Distinguished Flying Cross was gazetted. This award citation noted:

"During the recent operations he heavily bombed an enemy dump, causing several fires; he then attacked hostile troops in the vicinity. Frequently he has returned to our lines with his machine riddled with bullets."

He had survived the war while earning the nickname "Ack Ack", a slang term for anti-aircraft fire.

Post World War I
On 25 May 1919 Leitch was detailed to carry out deck trials on the world's first aircraft carrier, . This may explain why, two days later, he was gazetted as still employed as a captain. On 30 July 1919 he arrived in Archangel, Russia. He crashed the next day and was repatriated. On 5 September 1919 he gave up his flight lieutenant's position upon the end of his employment as such. This seems to signal the end of his career in the Royal Air Force.

After returning to his native Canada, he joined the Royal Canadian Air Force, remaining in until his retirement in 1938. He rose to the rank of Squadron Leader. When World War II came, he served as a civilian safety officer in Edmonton, Alberta with No. 16 Technical Detachment.

See also
 Photographing Canada from Flying Canoes. S. Bernard Shaw, GeneralStore PublishingHouse, 2001. , .

References
 Above the Trenches: A Complete Record of the Fighter Aces and Units of the British Empire Air Forces 1915–1920. Christopher F. Shores, Norman Franks, Russell Guest. Grub Street, 1990. , .
 Sopwith Camel Aces of World War 1: Volume 52 of Aircraft of the Aces: Volume 52 of Osprey Aircraft of the Aces. Norman Franks. Osprey Publishing, 2003. , .

External links
There is a picture of his grave at http://www.findagrave.com/cgi-bin/fg.cgi?page=pv&GRid=50299411&PIpi=27056968.

Endnotes

1894 births
1954 deaths
People from Westman Region, Manitoba
Royal Flying Corps officers
Canadian recipients of the Military Cross
Recipients of the Distinguished Flying Cross (United Kingdom)
Royal Canadian Air Force officers